Pareng Partners is a Philippine television news magazine program broadcast by ABS-CBN on July 28, 2018 and airs every Saturday at 5:15 pm (PST). It is hosted by Anthony Taberna and Jorge Cariño. The show ended on March 23, 2019 with a total of 34 episodes. It was replaced by DocuCentral Presents in its timeslot.

Hosts
 Anthony Taberna
 Jorge Cariño

Typhoon Ompong Special coverage
On September 15, 2018, on the day Typhoon Ompong (Mangkhut) struck Northern Luzon, Pareng Partners aired a Special Coverage live from the ABS-CBN News Studio, serving as lead-in to TV Patrol Weekend as it uses the latter's graphics. This coverage was hosted by Jorge Cariño and joined by TV Patrol Weekend co-anchor Alvin Elchico.

See also
List of programs broadcast by ABS-CBN

References

External links
 
 

ABS-CBN original programming
2018 Philippine television series debuts
2019 Philippine television series endings
ABS-CBN News and Current Affairs shows
Philippine documentary television series
Filipino-language television shows